The Arboretum de la Forêt d'Epinal (1.1 hectares) is an arboretum located in Saut-le-Cerf, in the 3600-hectare communal forest of Épinal, Vosges, Grand Est, France.

See also 
 List of botanical gardens in France

References 
 Ville Épinal: Patrimoine (French)
 France, le trésor des régions (French)
 L'Echo des Chênaies entry (French)

Epinal, Arboretum de la Foret d'
Epinal, Arboretum de la Foret d'
Epinal, Arboretum de la Foret d'
Geography of Vosges (department)
Tourist attractions in Vosges (department)